Carlos Porrata Doria (c. 1946 - August 19, 2019) was a Puerto Rican television gossiper and personality. He was better known as Charlie Too Much.

Religious views and sexuality
After identifying as homosexual for decades, Porrata Doria revealed, during 2014, he had become a newborn Christian.

References

1940s births
2019 deaths
Puerto Rican LGBT entertainers
Puerto Rican television personalities
Year of birth uncertain
21st-century LGBT people